Central African Republic competed in the 2003 All-Africa Games held at the National Stadium in the city of Abuja, Nigeria. The country entered seventeen events, and gained a gold medal in Taekwondo, ranking joint 19th in the medal table.

Competitors
Central African Republic competed in seventeen events at the games. Athletes included Maria-Joëlle Conjungo who entered the Women's 100 metres hurdles, three-time Olympian Ernest Ndjissipou in the Men's 5000 metres and Thibaut Bomaya, who went on to represent Central African Republic at the Paralympics.

Medal summary
Central African Republic won a single gold medal and was ranked joint 19th alongside Cape Verde.

Medal table

List of Medalists

Gold Medal

References

2003 in Central African Republic sport
Nations at the 2003 All-Africa Games
2003